Aleksandr Menshchikov (born 1 January 1973) is a Russian former wrestler. He competed in the men's Greco-Roman 85 kg at the 2000 Summer Olympics.

References

External links
 

1973 births
Living people
Russian male sport wrestlers
Olympic wrestlers of Russia
Wrestlers at the 2000 Summer Olympics
People from Kurgan, Kurgan Oblast
Sportspeople from Kurgan Oblast